Drosophila sulfurigaster is a species of fly (the taxonomic order Diptera) in the family Drosophilidae. It was first described by Oswald Duda in 1923. According to the Catalogue of Life D. sulfurigaster does not have subspecies.

References

Insects described in 1923
sulfurigaster